Giant lily is a common name for several plants and may refer to:

Victoria amazonica, a water lily native to the shallow waters of the Amazon River basin
Cardiocrinum giganteum, a lily native to the Himalayas, China, and Myanmar